That Was Then This Is Now may refer to:

Music 
That Was Then, This Is Now (Tha Dogg Pound album), 2009
"That Was Then, This Is Now" (The James Cleaver Quintet album), 2011
That Was Then This Is Now (Wain McFarlane album), 2001
That Was Then, This Is Now, Vol. 1 (1999) and That Was Then, This Is Now, Vol. 2 (2000), studio albums by American rapper  Frost
That Was Then, This Is Now (Andy Timmons album), an album by Andy Timmons
"That Was Then, This Is Now" (song), a 1986 song by The Mosquitos, also covered by The Monkees
That Was Then, This Is Now, an album by Chasen
That Was Then, This Is Now (Josh Wilson album), 2015

Other uses
That Was Then, This Is Now, a 1971 novel by S. E. Hinton
That Was Then... This Is Now, a 1985 film based on Hinton's novel
That Was Then, This Is Now (radio series), a BBC Radio 2 comedy sketch series

See also

"That Was Then but This Is Now", a 1983 song by ABC
That was Now, This is Then, a 2022 novel by Michael Z. Williamson
If Not Now Then When?, an album by Ethan Johns
If Not Now Then When, an album by The Motels
If Not Now, When? (disambiguation)